Le Moyen (also LeMoyen, Lemoyen) is an unincorporated community in St. Landry Parish, Louisiana, United States. Its ZIP Code is 71356.

Notes

Unincorporated communities in St. Landry Parish, Louisiana
Unincorporated communities in Louisiana